Clifton Livingston is an English professional football manager.

Career
In 2000, he coached the Anguilla national football team.

References

External links
Profile at Soccerway.com
Profile at Soccerpunter.com

Year of birth missing (living people)
Living people
English football managers
Expatriate football managers in Anguilla
Anguilla national football team managers
Place of birth missing (living people)
English expatriate sportspeople in Anguilla
English expatriate football managers